Qilakitsoq is an abandoned settlement and an important  archaeological site in Greenland. It became known as the discovery location of eight mummified corpses from the Thule period. The Inuit mummies of Qilakitsoq offer important insights into the lives of Inuit about 500 years ago.

Qilakitsoq is located in West Greenland near the city of Uummannaq on the northern coast of the Nuussuaq peninsula (Greenlandic: Big Cape) in a sheltered cover of the Karrat Fjord. The Greenlandic name means "that which has very little sky," which probably refers to the steep cliffs which surround the area as well as its frequently occurring fog.

History 
This area was first settled by people of the Saqqaq culture about 4300 years ago, who presumably traveled via Ellesmere Island. A later wave of migration from Alaska via Canada ended in Greenland around 1000 BC and resulted in a more modern settlement of the region surrounding Qilakitsoq. In the time of the Thule culture, which lasted until about AD 1800, a settlement of about 30 residents was located here. They lived as hunters and gatherers; in the winter, they resided primarily in sod houses, while they spent summers living in tents on extended hunting trips in the surrounding fjords. The region was rich in game; in addition to seals and whales, polar bears, reindeer, and rock ptarmigans were probably also hunted. People fished as well.

The first description of Qilakitsoq, which was named "Killekitok" by Europeans at the time, is from 1789, shortly after the founding of the Uummannaq colony (1761). At this time, Qilakitsoq was, much like other similar settlements, only occasionally populated in the winter; this lifestyle is ascribed to the Thule culture of the time and was comparable to the lifestyles of mummies found from around the year 1500. The last description of a permanent settlement in Qilakitsoq was written in 1811. Shortly thereafter, the settlement was apparently abandoned by its native population. A reason for this migration could be competition for food from the newly arriving Europeans, who used nets to hunt seals in large numbers.

Archaeological finds 
As early as 1903, Qilakitsoq proved to be a prominent site of archaeological findings when the colonial administrator at the time sent several discovered artifacts to the National Museum of Denmark. Among other items were household objects and hunting tools, most of which are from the region's early history.

There are several gravesites in Qilakitsoq and, even today, one can find human remains under piles of stones. On October 9, 1972, two hunters, Hans and Jokum Grønvold from Uummannaq, discovered a grave containing several mummies while they were out hunting for rock ptarmigans. They covered the graves up again, and immediately alerted the authorities. Even so, it was not until 1978 that the first scientific investigations of the gravesites took place and soon thereafter, the mummies were transferred to Copenhagen for further research. In the meantime, there was already evidence of lasting damage by careless visitors; Hans and Jokum Grønvold repaired the partially covered graves multiple times.

In 1982, the mummies were brought back to Greenland as part of a repatriation of Greenlandic cultural assets. In their current home at the Greenland National Museum (Kalaallit Nunaata Katersugaasivia) in the Greenlandic capital city of Nuuk, the four best-preserved mummies are publicly exhibited and comprise one of the biggest tourist attractions in Nuuk.

Grave sites 
The grave of the eight mummies differs from other Qilakitsoq gravesites in that it was the only one that lay about 200 m outside of the settlement and contained several corpses. It was located beneath an overhanging cliff and consists of a pile of large stones, as was usual due to a lack of suitable soil. This site offered optimal conditions for natural mummification; the bodies were in a cold, dry, and well-ventilated atmosphere, protected from animals and the weather.

The corpses were piled on top of one another in two groups only about one meter apart. They were fully clothed and were cushioned and covered with sealskins, flat stones, and grass.

Mummies 
Due to certain clues such as age and location, the mummies were assumed to be two non-related families for a long time; later, as a result of mtDNA analyses, it could be proven that there were familial links between people in both graves. Radiocarbon dating yielded a probable time of death around 1475 with a margin of error of about ±50 years. Investigations were performed as carefully as possible; the four best-preserved mummies were neither derobed nor opened. Intense conservation measures were also avoided.

The numbering of the mummies follows the classifications of the initial investigators: specifically, the corpses were divided by graves and numbered from top to bottom.

Grave I

I/1 A boy about six months 
This best-preserved mummy was initially thought by its discoverers to be a doll. The especially good conservation can probably be attributed to a faster loss of body heat due to its smaller size. He likely descended from I/4 or II/7. It is considered possible that, after the death of his mother, the boy was either buried alive or suffocated, which was typical for children younger than two years of age in order to spare them a slow death by starvation.

I/2 A four-year-old boy 
This boy, probably the son of I/3, was likely also abandoned during his short life, especially because he presumably displayed signs of Down syndrome and the abandonment of disabled children was widely practiced at the time. There is, however, no sign of strangulation, which is commonly noted as the cause of death in these cases. The boy could have died from the immediate consequences of his illness. There is evidence to suggest that, at any rate, this mummy was rebedded posthumously.

I/3 A 20- to 30-year-old woman 
This mummy is most likely the daughter of II/6 or II/8 and not, as originally assumed, the sister of I/4. This woman is also exhibited in the museum in Nuuk. Possible causes of death may be a kidney stone or an intestinal obstruction.

I/4 A woman over 30 years 
This mummy is also well-preserved and can be viewed in Nuuk. She might be the sister of II/7.

I/5 A woman of about 50 years 
This woman is, according to the results of a DNA analysis, not maternally related to any of the other mummies.

Grave II

II/6 A woman of about 50 years 
This well-preserved mummy, who can be viewed in the museum, is likely the sister of II/8. Her tattoos differ conspicuously from those of other women.

II/7 A woman of about 20 years 
This woman could have been the sister of I/4. She was the only adult woman who wasn't tattooed, which may indicate that she was unmarried. Food remains were found in her intestines, providing insight into her diet. As expected, there was a low proportion of plant-based nutrition; surprisingly, in addition to pollen, the remains of partially burned evergreen bark was found which was not native to this region. There was more rust in her lungs than in modern-day residents of large cities, which can primarily be attributed to the use of whale-oil lamps in their small dwellings. The mummy is in relatively poor condition in comparison with her well-preserved clothing. Even though her internal organs were thoroughly examined, no evidence could be found that might indicate a cause of death.

II/8 A woman of about 50 years 
This mummy is very poorly preserved. She could be the sister of II/6. The woman suffered from a malignant, end-stage tumor, which probably impaired her senses of hearing and sight, as well as a poorly healed broken shoulder. Her poor health could be a possible cause of death. As with all of the older women found, she was missing several teeth. Furthermore, all the older mummies showed clear signs of dental erosion, which might be explained by their tough diets as well as by stress caused by tanning and removing fur from leather (here, animal hides were removed by scraping with the teeth). Bad teeth were especially dangerous for Inuit peoples with regard to their diets, which were largely raw, meat-based, and difficult to chew.

Clothing 
All mummies were fully clothed such that both the clothing and their usage could be comprehensively investigated. The custom of burying people fully clothed derives from the concept that they may need this clothing for their journey to the land of the dead. A total of 78 articles of clothing were discovered. Of note were the Kamit (singular: Kamik), nearly waterproof boots stitched from sealskin, which were insulated from the cold using hay. Socks were generally worn under the Kamit. The mummies generally wore two layers of clothing: outer and inner (mostly short) pants, and both an outer and an inner anorak. Mummy II/8 even wore three. The inner anoraks were largely made of bird feathers, whereby five different species of bird were used to make one anorak; the outer layers were made of sealskin. The use of different colors and their arrangement suggest conscious design for aesthetic purposes.

Other mummies found in Greenland 
Similar, although not as well-preserved, mummies were also found on the Uunartoq Island in South Greenland and on the Pisissarfik mountain near Nuuk.

See also 
 Dorset culture
 Saqqaq culture

Literature 

 Jens Peder Hart Hansen, Jørgen Meldgaard, Jørgen Nordqvist (eds.): The Greenland Mummies. British Museum Publications, London 1991, 
 Jens Peder Hart Hansen, Jørgen Meldgaard, Jørgen Nordqvist: The Mummies of Qilakitsoq. In: National Geographic Society (eds.): National Geographic Magazine. Volume 167, No. 2. National Geographic Society, February 1985, ISSN 0027-9358.

References

 Hansen, Jens P. Hart; Meldgaard, Jørgen and Nordqvist, Jørgen (1985) "The Mummies of Qilakitsoq"  National Geographic 167(2): pp. 191–207

External links 

 Greenland National Museum and Archives. Greenland National Museum in Nuuk, accessed on February 24, 2018
 Northwest Passage – The Adventure Continues – Part 3 (archived), accessed on February 24, 2018 (pictures from the discovery site)
 M. Thomas, P. Gilbert, Durita Djurhuus, Linea Melchior, Niels Lynnerup, Michael Worobey, Andrew S. Wilson, Claus Andreasen, Jørgen Dissing: mtDNA Analysis of Qilakitsoq Mummies (gif), accessed on March 15, 2008 (graphical representation of the familial relationships between the mummies).

Archaeological sites in Greenland
Former populated places in Greenland
History of Greenland
Mummies
Uummannaq Fjord
1972 archaeological discoveries
Inuit